Dzmitry Alyaksandravich Kamarowski (born 10 October 1986) is a Belarusian professional football coach and former player. He is the manager of Isloch Minsk Raion.

International career
In February 2012, he received his first call-up to the Belarus national side following the withdrawal of Sergei Kornilenko due to injury. On 29 February 2012, he made his debut in a friendly match against Moldova.

Honours
Naftan Novopolotsk
Belarusian Cup winner: 2008–09

Shakhtyor Soligorsk
Belarusian Cup winner: 2014–15

External links

1986 births
Living people
People from Orsha
Sportspeople from Vitebsk Region
Belarusian footballers
Association football forwards
Belarusian expatriate footballers
Expatriate footballers in Russia
Expatriate footballers in Uzbekistan
Belarus international footballers
Russian Premier League players
FC BATE Borisov players
FC Torpedo Moscow players
FC Naftan Novopolotsk players
FC Shakhtyor Soligorsk players
FC Gomel players
FC Rotor Volgograd players
FC Belshina Bobruisk players
FC Isloch Minsk Raion players
FK Neftchi Farg'ona players
Belarusian football managers
FC Isloch Minsk Raion managers